Viheri is a lake. It is located in the area of Joutsa municipality, in the Central Finland region in Finland. It is almost totally open water area because there is only a couple of small islands.

References

Lakes of Joutsa